El Troncal Airport  is an airport serving the river town of Arauquita in the Arauca Department of Colombia. East departures cross the river into Venezuela.

See also

Transport in Colombia
List of airports in Colombia

References

External links
FallingRain - Arauquita Airport

Airports in Colombia